Friday Chinedu Ahunanya (born 19 November 1971) is a Nigerian professional boxer. He is a journeyman heavyweight best known for beating several undefeated prospects and for his appearances on ESPN fight cards.

Amateur career
 1994: World Cup, Bangkok, Thailand, Heavyweight:
 Lost to Georgi Kandelaki (Georgia) on points

 1994: Commonwealth Games, Victoria, Heavyweight:
Defeated Roland Raforme (Seychelles) on points
Lost to Stephen Gallinger (Canada) on points

Professional career
Known as Friday "The 13th," Ahunanya began his career in 1998 with a good deal of promise, winning his first 16 fights including a victory over undefeated (16-0-1) Nate Jones. In 2001 he lost a decision to undefeated (15-0) Olympian and future titlist Serguei Lyakhovich. In 2002, he handed French Olympian Josue Blocus his first loss.

In 2004, he had his only early loss when hit in the eye in the 4th round by Lance Whitaker.  The loss to Whitaker was the beginning of decline for Ahunanya. He went on to lose to Taurus Sykes in New Mexico, who was not highly regarded in spite of his 22-1-1 record in 2005, arguably the low point of his career.

He then drew with fringe contender Dominick Guinn, and then was competitive in losing efforts against undefeated prospects Sultan Ibragimov (Olympic silver medalist) and Alexander Povetkin (Olympic Gold medalist).

In 2007 he rebounded by handing 19-0 New Zealand prospect Shane Cameron his first loss by knocking him down twice in the 12th and final round. After the second knockdown, the referee intervened and stopped the contest, earning Ahunanya a TKO victory. In 2008 he stopped another undefeated prospect in Alonzo Butler.

Ahunanya lost to David Tua in March 2010 in New Zealand via decision. However Ahunanya and his manager claimed he should have won, and would have if the fight had been in the USA. After further review it was obvious that David Tua won the fight by unanimous decision.

Professional boxing record

References

External links
 

1971 births
Heavyweight boxers
Living people
Sportspeople from Port Harcourt
Nigerian male boxers